Baltiska Hallen (The Baltic Hall) is a multi-purpose indoor arena in the Stadionområdet area of Malmö, Sweden. It opened in 1964 in memory of the 50th anniversary of the Baltic Exhibition in 1914. The arena has a capacity of 4.000 people and is the home of HK Malmö.

Events
It has served as host to numerous of events such as the 1964 Table Tennis European Championships, 1967 IHF World Men's Handball Championships, 1996 Davis Cup, 2006 Men's World Floorball Championships and 2006 European Women's Handball Championships.

Over the years, it played host to The Rolling Stones, Johnny Cash, Ulf Lundell and Gilbert O'Sullivan.

References

External links
 

Sports venues completed in 1964
Sports venues in Malmö
Sport in Malmö